Gerardo Agustín Alcalá García (born 28 June 1961) is a Mexican former long-distance runner.

In the 5000 metres he won the silver medal at the 1983 Pan American Games. He also competed at the 1984 Olympic Games without reaching the final.

In the 10,000 metres he won the bronze medal at the 1982 Central American and Caribbean Games and the silver medal at the 1986 Central American and Caribbean Games. He later finished fourth at the 1990 Goodwill Games in 27:43.07 minutes. This was his personal best time. At the 1983 Central American and Caribbean Championships he won both the 5000 and 10,000 metres.

His personal best time in the 5000 metres was 13:29.49 minutes, achieved in August 1990 in Brussels. His personal best in the marathon was 2:12:11 hours, achieved when he finished seventh at the 1988 Chicago Marathon.

References

1961 births
Living people
Mexican male long-distance runners
Mexican male marathon runners
Athletes (track and field) at the 1984 Summer Olympics
Olympic athletes of Mexico
Athletes (track and field) at the 1983 Pan American Games
Pan American Games silver medalists for Mexico
Pan American Games medalists in athletics (track and field)
Competitors at the 1982 Central American and Caribbean Games
Competitors at the 1986 Central American and Caribbean Games
Central American and Caribbean Games silver medalists for Mexico
Central American and Caribbean Games bronze medalists for Mexico
Central American and Caribbean Games medalists in athletics
Competitors at the 1990 Goodwill Games
Medalists at the 1983 Pan American Games
20th-century Mexican people